is a video game for the Super NES and the Nintendo 64. Due to this game being released near the end of the N64 production cycle and there not being many copies produced, it has become one of the most valuable and rarest N64 games.

Gameplay
Four computer opponents are available, two female and two male. There are three modes: Golf, Normal, and Practice where the player constructs their own scenarios and practices knocking down the bowling pins with either one or two balls.

Reception

Entertainment Weekly gave the game a B and wrote that "while it still doesn't rack up to the real thing, at least Super Bowl (for Super NES) has a sense of humor — an animated green chicken comments on the action, the on-screen players make funny faces when they throw gutter balls, and there's a 'golf ball' option that lets you alleviate bowling's inherent lack of excitement by assigning pars for different pin setups. Unlike The Blue Marlin or Side Pocket, Super Bowling offers at least one improvement over the real-life game: Scoring is completely automatic, meaning you don't need a degree in particle physics to tabulate two spares after a strike."

See also
 World Bowling - Game Boy

Notes

References

External links
 Super Bowling (Nintendo 64) at GameFAQs
 Super Bowling (Super NES) at GameFAQs

1992 video games
Athena (company) games
Bowling video games
KID games
Multiplayer and single-player video games
Nintendo 64 games
Super Nintendo Entertainment System games
Technōs Japan games
Video games developed in Japan